The Echo is a 1915 American silent short romantic drama directed by Tom Ricketts. The film stars Jack Richardson, Vivian Rich, Charlotte Burton, B. Reeves Eason, Perry Banks, Louise Lester, David Lythgoe, and Harry von Meter.

Cast
 Jack Richardson as Mr. Wellborn
 Vivian Rich as Violet Wellborn, His Daughter
 Byron Thornberg as John Grant, Aged 12
 David Lythgoe as John Grant
 Perry Banks as Mr. Grant
 Louise Lester as Mrs. Grant
 Harry von Meter as Count de Brasse
 B. Reeves Eason as Ferryman

External links
 

1915 films
1915 romantic drama films
1915 short films
American romantic drama films
American black-and-white films
American silent short films
Films directed by Tom Ricketts
1910s American films
Silent romantic drama films
Silent American drama films